The River dragonet (Callionymus fluviatilis) is a species of dragonet native to southern and southeastern Asia where it is found in the lower portions of rivers to the ocean.  It is of minor importance to local commercial fisheries.  This species grows to a length of  TL.

References 

F
Fish described in 1876